Marimatha obliquata is a moth of the family Noctuidae first described by Gottlieb August Wilhelm Herrich-Schäffer in 1868. It is found on Cuba.

References

Moths described in 1868
Acontiinae
Endemic fauna of Cuba